The 2021 Sudamérica Rugby Women's Sevens was a qualification tournament for the 2022 Rugby World Cup Sevens in South Africa. The tournament was held in Montevideo, Uruguay from 11–12 November. Brazil and Colombia both qualified for the World Cup after finishing in first and second place.

Teams

Pool stage

Pool A

Pool B

Final & Playoffs

Semifinals

Playoffs 
9th Place7th Place5th PlaceBronze FinalFinal

Final standings

References 

2021 in women's rugby union
2021 rugby sevens competitions
Rugby sevens competitions in South America